The 2011 Macau Open Grand Prix Gold was a badminton tournament which took place at the Cotai Arena in the Venetian, Macau on 29 November to 4 December 2011 and had a total purse of $200,000.

Men's singles

Seeds

 Lee Chong Wei (withdrew)
 Lin Dan (withdrew)
 Taufik Hidayat (quarterfinals)
 Du Pengyu (final)
 Simon Santoso (semifinals)
 Lee Hyun-il (champion)
 Wang Zhengming (quarterfinals)
 Kenichi Tago (quarterfinals)
 Tommy Sugiarto (third round)
 Hu Yun (second round)
 Son Wan-ho (third round)
 Wong Wing Ki (third round)
 Dionysius Hayom Rumbaka (third round)
 Parupalli Kashyap (quarterfinals)
 Alamsyah Yunus (third round)
 Hsueh Hsuan-yi (third round)

Finals

Women's singles

Seeds

 Wang Shixian (champion)
 Jiang Yanjiao (second round)
 Cheng Shao-chieh (semifinals)
 Sung Ji-hyun (first round)
 Bae Yeon-ju (quarterfinals)
 Porntip Buranaprasertsuk (second round)
 Ratchanok Intanon (first round)
 Li Xuerui (semifinals)

Finals

Men's doubles

Seeds

  Ko Sung-hyun / Yoo Yeon-seong (final)
  Mohammad Ahsan / Bona Septano (quarterfinals)
  Chai Biao / Guo Zhendong (champion)
  Markis Kido / Hendra Setiawan (quarterfinals)
  Hendra Aprida Gunawan / Alvent Yulianto (semifinals)
  Hirokatsu Hashimoto / Noriyasu Hirata (withdrew)
  Fang Chieh-min / Lee Sheng-mu (semifinals)
  Naoki Kawamae / Shoji Sato (second round)

Finals

Women's doubles

Seeds

  Cheng Wen-hsing / Chien Yu-chin (withdrew)
  Miyuki Maeda / Satoko Suetsuna (semifinals)
  Shizuka Matsuo / Mami Naito (semifinals)
  Meiliana Jauhari / Greysia Polii (quarterfinals)
  Poon Lok Yan / Tse Ying Suet (second round)
  Vita Marissa / Nadya Melati (first round)
  Duanganong Aroonkesorn / Kunchala Voravichitchaikul (quarterfinals)
  Jung Kyung-eun / Kim Ha-na (champion)

Finals

Mixed doubles

Seeds

  Tontowi Ahmad / Liliyana Natsir (champion)
  Chen Hung-ling / Cheng Wen-hsing (final)
  Sudket Prapakamol / Saralee Thoungthongkam (semifinals)
  Songphon Anugritayawon / Kunchala Voravichitchaikul (second round)
  Chan Peng Soon / Goh Liu Ying (second round)
  Shintaro Ikeda / Reiko Shiota (withdrew)
  Lee Sheng-mu / Chien Yu-chin (withdrew)
  Nova Widianto / Vita Marissa (second round)

Finals

References

External links
 Tournament Link

Macau Open Badminton Championships
Macau Open
Macau Open